The intensity  of a counting process is a measure of the rate of change of its predictable part. If a stochastic process  is a counting process, then it is a submartingale, and in particular its  Doob-Meyer decomposition is 

.

Definition

 .

The right-continuity property of counting processes allows us to take this limit from the right.

Estimation

which involves an Ito integral.

,

where the  have a factor of  so that they are orthonormal under the standard  norm, then by choosing appropriate data-driven weights  which depend on a parameter  and introducing the weighted norm 

,

the estimator for  can be given:

. 

Then, the estimator  is just .

 

References

 

Stochastic processes